Paragalaxias is a genus of freshwater fish of the family Galaxiidae, endemic to the Central Highlands of Tasmania.

Species
There are currently four recognized species in this genus:
 Paragalaxias dissimilis (Regan, 1906) (Shannon galaxias)
 Paragalaxias eleotroides McDowall & Fulton, 1978 (Great Lake darter)
 Paragalaxias julianus McDowall & Fulton, 1978 (Julian galaxias)
 Paragalaxias mesotes McDowall & Fulton, 1978 (Arthurs paragalaxias)

References
 

 
Freshwater fish genera
 
Central Highlands (Tasmania)